Emily Fox may refer to:

Emily Fox (basketball) (born 1987), American basketball player and former world record holder at sport stacking
Emily Fox (soccer) (born 1998), American soccer player
Emily Jane Fox, American reporter